Jean Merilyn Simmons,  (31 January 1929 – 22 January 2010) was a British actress and singer. One of J. Arthur Rank's "well-spoken young starlets", she appeared predominantly in films, beginning with those made in Great Britain during and after World War II, followed mainly by Hollywood films from 1950 onwards.

Simmons was nominated for the Academy Award for Best Supporting Actress for Hamlet (1948), and won a Golden Globe Award for Best Actress for Guys and Dolls (1955). Her other film appearances include Young Bess (1953), The Robe (1953), The Big Country (1958), Elmer Gantry (1960), Spartacus (1960), and the 1969 film The Happy Ending, for which she was nominated for the Academy Award for Best Actress. She also won an Emmy Award for the miniseries The Thorn Birds (1983).

Biography

Early life
Simmons was born on 31 January 1929, in Islington, London, to Charles Simmons, a bronze medalist in gymnastics at the 1912 Summer Olympics, and his wife, Winifred Ada (née Loveland). Jean was the youngest of four children, with siblings Lorna, Harold, and Edna. She began acting at the age of 14.

During the Second World War, the Simmons family was evacuated to Winscombe, Somerset. Her father, a physical education teacher, taught briefly at Sidcot School, and some time during this period, Simmons followed her eldest sister onto the village stage and sang popular songs such as "Daddy Wouldn't Buy Me a Bow Wow". At this point, her ambition was to be an acrobatic dancer.

Early films
On her return to London, Simmons enrolled at the Aida Foster School of Dance. She was spotted by director Val Guest, who cast her in the Margaret Lockwood vehicle Give Us the Moon (1944) in a large role as Lockwood's sister.
Small roles in several other films followed, including Mr. Emmanuel (1944), Kiss the Bride Goodbye (1945), Meet Sexton Blake (1945), and the popular The Way to the Stars (1945), as well as the short Sports Day (1945).

Simmons had a small part as a harpist in the high-profile Caesar and Cleopatra (1945), produced by Gabriel Pascal, starring Vivien Leigh, and co-starring Simmons's future husband Stewart Granger. Pascal saw potential in Simmons, and in 1945 he signed her to a seven-year contract to the J. Arthur Rank Organisation.

Great Expectations and stardom
Simmons became a star in Britain when she was cast as the young Estella in David Lean's version of Great Expectations (1946). The movie was the third-most popular film at the British box office in 1947, and Simmons received excellent reviews.

The experience of working on Great Expectations caused her to pursue an acting career more seriously:

Simmons had support roles in Hungry Hill (1947) with Margaret Lockwood and the Powell-Pressburger film Black Narcissus (1947), playing an Indian woman in the latter alongside Sabu.

Simmons was top-billed for the first time in the drama Uncle Silas (1947). She followed it with The Woman in the Hall (1947). Neither was particularly successful; but Simmons was then in a huge international hit, playing Ophelia in Laurence Olivier's Hamlet (1948), for which she received her first Oscar nomination. Olivier offered her the chance to work and study at the Old Vic, advising her to play anything they offered her to get experience; but she was under contract to Rank, which vetoed the idea.

Simmons had the lead in Frank Launder's The Blue Lagoon (1949), based on the novel by Henry De Vere Stacpoole and co-produced with Launder's partner Sidney Gilliat, a project originally announced for Lockwood a decade earlier. It was a considerable financial success.

Stewart Granger
Simmons starred with Stewart Granger in the comedy Adam and Evelyne (1949). It was her first adult role, and Granger and she became romantically involved; they soon married.

Simmons made two films that were popular at the local box office: So Long at the Fair (1950) with Dirk Bogarde and Trio (1950), where she was one of several stars. She was then in Cage of Gold (1950) with David Farrar and Ralph Thomas' The Clouded Yellow (1950) with Trevor Howard. In 1950, Simmons was voted the fourth-most popular star in Britain.

Howard Hughes and Victor Mature

Granger became a Hollywood star in King Solomon's Mines (1950) and was signed to a contract by MGM, so Simmons moved to Los Angeles with him. In 1951, Rank sold her contract to Howard Hughes, who then owned RKO Pictures.

Hughes was eager to start a sexual relationship with Simmons, but Granger put a stop to his advances by angrily telling Hughes over the phone: "Mr Howard bloody Hughes, you'll be sorry if you don't leave my wife alone." Her first Hollywood film was Androcles and the Lion (1952), produced by Pascal and co-starring Victor Mature. It was followed by Angel Face (1953), directed by Otto Preminger with Robert Mitchum. According to David Thomson, "If she had made only one film—Angel Face—she might now be spoken of with the awe given to Louise Brooks." Smarting over his rebuff from Granger, Hughes instructed Preminger to treat Simmons as roughly as possible, leading the director to demand that costar Mitchum repeatedly slap the actress harder and harder, until Mitchum turned and punched Preminger, asking if that was how he wanted it.

To further punish Simmons and Granger, Hughes refused to lend her to Paramount where director William Wyler wanted to cast her in the female lead for his film Roman Holiday; the role made a star of Audrey Hepburn. He also made her appear in She Couldn't Say No (1954), a comedy with Mitchum.

A court case freed Simmons from the contract with Hughes in 1952. They settled out of court; part of the arrangement was that Simmons would do one more film for no additional money. Simmons also agreed to make three more movies under the auspices of RKO, but not actually at that studio—she would be lent out. She would make an additional picture for 20th Century Fox while RKO got the services of Victor Mature for one film.

MGM cast her in the lead of Young Bess (1953) playing a young Queen Elizabeth I with Granger. She went back to RKO to do the extra film under the settlement with Hughes, titled Affair with a Stranger (1953) with Mature; it flopped.

20th Century Fox
Simmons went over to 20th Century Fox to play the female lead in The Robe (1953), the first CinemaScope movie and an enormous financial success. Less popular was The Actress (1953) at MGM alongside Spencer Tracy; it was one of her personal favorites.

Fox asked Simmons back for The Egyptian (1954), another epic, but it was not especially popular. She had the lead in Columbia's A Bullet Is Waiting (1954). More widely seen was Désirée (1954), where Simmons played Désirée Clary to Marlon Brando's Napoleon Bonaparte.

Simmons and Granger returned to England to make the thriller Footsteps in the Fog (1955). Then, Joseph Mankiewicz cast her opposite Brando in the screen adaptation of Guys and Dolls (1955), playing a role turned down by Grace Kelly; it was a big hit.

Simmons played the title role in Hilda Crane (1956) at Fox, a box-office disappointment. So, too, were This Could Be the Night (1957) and Until They Sail (1957), both at MGM.

Simmons had a big success, though,  in The Big Country (1958), directed by William Wyler. She starred in Home Before Dark (1958) at Warner Bros. and This Earth Is Mine (1959) with Rock Hudson at Universal. In the opinion of film critic Philip French, Home Before Dark was "perhaps her finest performance as a housewife driven into a breakdown in Mervyn LeRoy's psychodrama."

Elmer Gantry and Richard Brooks
Simmons went into Elmer Gantry (1960), directed by Richard Brooks, who became her second husband. It was successful, as was Spartacus (1960), where she played Kirk Douglas' love interest. Simmons then did The Grass Is Greener (1960) with Mitchum, Cary Grant, and Deborah Kerr.

She took some years off screen, then returned in All the Way Home (1963) with Robert Preston. She did Life at the Top (1965) with Laurence Harvey, Mister Buddwing (1966) with James Garner, Divorce American Style (1967) with Dick Van Dyke, and Rough Night in Jericho (1967) with George Peppard and Dean Martin.

Simmons did Heidi (1968) for TV, then Brooks wrote and directed The Happy Ending (1969) for her, and she received her second Oscar nomination.

1970s and 1980s
By the 1970s, Simmons turned her focus to stage and television acting. She toured the United States in Stephen Sondheim's A Little Night Music, then took the show to London, thus originated the role of Desirée Armfeldt in the West End. Performing in the show for three years, she said she never tired of Sondheim's music; "No matter how tired or 'off' you felt, the music would just pick you up."

She portrayed Fiona "Fee" Cleary, the Cleary family matriarch, in the miniseries The Thorn Birds (1983); she won an Emmy Award for her role. She appeared in North and South (1985–86), again playing the role of the family matriarch as Clarissa Main, and starred in The Dawning (1988) with Anthony Hopkins and Hugh Grant. In 1989, Simmons appeared as murder mystery author Eudora McVeigh Shipton, a self proclaimed rival to Jessica Fletcher, in the two part Murder, She Wrote episode "Mirror, Mirror, On the Wall" with Angela Lansbury.

1990s and 2000s
In 1991, she made a late-career appearance in the Star Trek: The Next Generation episode "The Drumhead" as a retired Starfleet admiral and hardened legal investigator who conducts a witch hunt. That same year she starred in a remake of Great Expectations , this time playing the role of Miss Havisham, Estella's adoptive mother, and as Elizabeth Collins Stoddard/Naomi Collins, in the short-lived revival of the 1960s daytime series Dark Shadows, in roles originally played by Joan Bennett. From 1994 until 1998, Simmons narrated the A&E documentary television series Mysteries of the Bible. In 1995, she appeared in
"How to Make an American Quilt" with: Wynona Ryder, Maya Angelou, Ellen Burstyn, Anne Baxter, and Alfre Woodard. In 2004,  she voiced the lead role of Sophie in the English dub of Howl's Moving Castle.

Personal life
Simmons was married and divorced twice. At 21, she married Stewart Granger in Tucson, Arizona on 20 December 1950. She and Granger became U.S. citizens in 1956; in the same year, their daughter Tracy Granger was born. They divorced in 1960.

On 1 November 1960, Simmons married director Richard Brooks; their daughter, Kate Brooks, was born a year later in 1961. Simmons and Brooks divorced in 1980. Although both men were significantly older than Simmons, she denied she was looking for a father figure. Her father had died when she was just 16, but she said: "They were really nothing like my father at all. My father was a gentle, softly spoken man. My husbands were both much noisier and much more opinionated ... it's really nothing to do with age ... it's to do with what's there – the twinkle and sense of humour." And in a 1984 interview, given in Copenhagen at the time she was shooting the film Going Undercover (1988, aka, Yellow Pages, completed 1985) she elaborated slightly on her marriages, stating, 

Simmons had two daughters, Tracy Granger (a film editor since 1990), and Kate Brooks (a TV production assistant and producer), one by each marriage – their names bearing witness to Simmons's friendship with Spencer Tracy and Katharine Hepburn. Simmons moved to the East Coast of the US in the late 1970s, briefly owning a home in New Milford, Connecticut. She returned to California, settling in Santa Monica, California, where she lived until her death.

In the 2003 New Year Honours, Simmons was appointed an Officer of the Order of the British Empire (OBE) for services to acting.

In 2003, she became the patron of the British drugs and human rights charity Release. In 2005, she signed a petition to British Prime Minister Tony Blair asking him not to upgrade cannabis from a class C drug to class B.

Death
Simmons died from lung cancer at her home in Santa Monica on 22 January 2010, nine days before her 81st birthday. She is interred in Highgate Cemetery, north London.

Filmography

Box office ranking
For a number of years, British film exhibitors voted Simmons among the top ten British stars at the box office via an annual poll in the Motion Picture Herald.
1949 – 4th (9th most popular overall)
1950 – 2nd (4th most popular overall)
1951 – 3rd

Awards and nominations

References

Bibliography
 

 Capua, Michelangelo. Jean Simmons: Her Life and Career. McFarland, 2022. .

External links

Jean Simmons and Claire Bloom at aenigma

The Jean Simmons Memorial YouTube Page
Jean Simmons – A Fan Resource
Jean Simmons 1946 newsreel footage  from British Pathe   (newsreel search )
 Jean Simmons in motorboat Britlsh Pathe
Obituary in The New York Times (23 January 2010)
In Appreciation of Jean Simmons (1929–2010)
Photographs and literature

1929 births
2010 deaths
20th-century English actresses
21st-century English actresses
Actresses from London
Alumni of the Aida Foster Theatre School
American film actresses
American musical theatre actresses
American stage actresses
American television actresses
American voice actresses
Best Musical or Comedy Actress Golden Globe (film) winners
British expatriate actresses in the United States
Burials at Highgate Cemetery
Deaths from lung cancer in California
English emigrants to the United States
English expatriates in the United States
English film actresses
English musical theatre actresses
English stage actresses
English television actresses
English voice actresses
Officers of the Order of the British Empire
Outstanding Performance by a Supporting Actress in a Miniseries or Movie Primetime Emmy Award winners
People from Islington (district)
Volpi Cup for Best Actress winners
21st-century American women